Four Corners is an unincorporated community in Jackson County, Oregon, United States. It is slightly north of Rogue Valley International–Medford Airport.

References

Unincorporated communities in Jackson County, Oregon
Unincorporated communities in Oregon